Paberi is a village near Phulbani in Kandhamal district of Odisha state of India.

References

Villages in Kandhamal district